David Ross "Davy" Johnston (1942 – 2004) was a Scottish footballer, who played as a forward for Nairn County FC and Caledonian FC of the Scottish Highland Football League, and Heart of Midlothian FC and Aberdeen FC of the Scottish Football League.

Johnston began his senior football career as a 16 year old with his home town club, Nairn County FC. of the Scottish Highland Football League.  He transferred to Heart of Midlothian FC of the Scottish Football League at 18 years of age and was very quickly in the Hearts first team playing at the top level of Scottish football.  Due to homesickness Johnson returned to Nairn one year later and spent the next five years in Highland League football with Nairn County before transferring back into the Scottish League top tier of football with Aberdeen FC where he had a successful three years before once again returning to the Highland League, this time with Inverness team Caledonian FC, and finally finishing his senior football career at his first senior club, Nairn County FC.

Johnston was the subject of a 2010 book 'Pittodrie's Silent Assassin - Davy Johnston: Aberdeen, Nairn and Caley Sharpshooter' by journalist and lifelong Nairn County supporter Donald Wilson.

References

External links

1942 births
2004 deaths
Date of death missing
Place of death missing
Association football forwards
Scottish footballers
Nairn County F.C. players
Heart of Midlothian F.C. players
Aberdeen F.C. players
Caledonian F.C. players
Scottish Football League players
People from Nairn
Sportspeople from Highland (council area)